Con Ó Néill (sometimes anglicised as Con or Constantine O'Neill) was the titular head of the Clandeboye O'Neill dynasty.

Life
He was born in the Parish of Saint Catherine, Dublin, the only son and successor of the previous Head of the House, Phelim (Felix) O'Neill by his first marriage to Catherine Keating.

He lived in Dublin, County Dublin.

Marriage and issue
He married Cecilia O'Hanlon (Ireland, Leinster, Archbishopric of Dublin, Cashel, daughter of Captain Féilim Ó hAnluain (in English Phelim or Felix O'Hanlon) and wife, and had issue, three sons and six daughters:
 João O'Neill (in Irish Seán Ó Néill, in English Shane or John O'Neill), passed to Portugal with his brothers in 1740 for political and religious motives, married and had issue
 Félix O'Neill (in Irish Féilim Ó Neill, in English Phelim or Felix O'Neill), passed to Portugal with his brothers in 1740 for political and religious motives, married and had issue
 Carlos O'Neill (in Irish Cathal or Séarlas Ó Neill, in English Charles O'Neill), passed to Portugal with his brothers for political and religious motives, married and had issue
 Annabela O'Neill, married to ... Broghil and had issue
 Catherine O'Neill, married to Terence MacMahon and had issue
 Sara O'Neill, unmarried and without issue
 Alice O'Neill (in Irish Ailís Ní Néill), unmarried and without issue
 Anna O'Neill (in Irish Áine Ní Néill), unmarried and without issue
 ... O'Neill, without further notice, possibly died young

See also
 Irish nobility
 Irish kings
 Irish royal families
 O'Neill (surname)
 Uí Néill, the Irish Dynasty
 Ó Neill Dynasty Today
 O'Neill of Clannaboy

References

External links
 Conn (Constantine) O'Neill's Genealogy in a Portuguese Genealogical site
  O'Neill Genealogy

Irish lords
Connachta
O'Neill dynasty
Year of birth unknown
Year of death unknown